There are twelve Lee counties in the United States. Some have a single library branch within their county and other Lee counties have a system of multiple libraries. Lee County Library may refer to:
Lee County Library (Arkansas)
Lee County Library System (Florida)
Lee County Library (Georgia)
Lee County Public Libraries (Illinois)
Lee County Libraries (Iowa)
Lee County Public Library (Kentucky)
Lee County Library (Mississippi)
Lee County Library System (North Carolina)
Lee County Public Library (South Carolina)
Lee County Public Library (Virginia)

The public library for other counties named Lee in the United States include:
Lewis Cooper Jr Memorial Library of Lee County, Alabama.
Giddings Public Library of Lee County, Texas.